The 2012–13 Ford Trophy was the 42nd season of the official List A cricket tournament in New Zealand, and the second in a sponsorship deal between New Zealand Cricket and Ford Motor Company. The competition ran from 26 February 2013 to 30 March 2013, and was won by the Auckland Aces.

Teams
 Auckland Aces
 Northern Districts Knights
 Central Districts Stags
 Wellington Firebirds
 Canterbury Wizards
 Otago Volts

Grounds

Rules and regulations
Every match, points are allocated by the following:

Upon completion of the round-robin stage, the top two teams play each other in the 1st semi-final, with the winner advancing to the final and the loser advancing to the Preliminary Final, where they play the winner of the 2nd semi-final. The winner of the Preliminary Final will then advance to the Final.

Points table

Knockout stage

Fixtures
All times are in New Zealand Daylight Time (NZDT)

Knockout stage
Upon completion of the round-robin stage, the top two teams play each other in the 1st semi-final, with the winner advancing to the final and the loser advancing to the Preliminary Final, where they play the winner of the 2nd semi-final. The winner of the Preliminary Final will then advance to the Final.

Semi-finals

Preliminary final

Final

See also
Ford Trophy
2011-12 Ford Trophy

References
 1.http://www.blackcaps.co.nz/domestic/the-ford-trophy/138/schedule.aspx

External links
Blackcaps.co.nz

Ford Trophy
Ford Trophy
2012–13 New Zealand cricket season